Barry Price (born 8 March 1949) is a former Australian rules footballer who played 158 games and scored 60 goals with Collingwood Football Club between 1969 and 1977.

Price was a superb midfielder in a strong Collingwood outfit.  Quick, decisive, and elusive, he was soon teaming to telling effect with the Magpies' champion full forward, Peter McKenna.  In the four years that Price was at his best, 1969, 1970, 1971, and 1972, McKenna kicked 505 goals, many of them from bullet stab passes from Price.  McKenna claimed that Price's kicks were so hard, even from as far as 60 metres away, that after marking them, he would have red marks on his chest for days.

Though only 177 cm tall, Price was courageous and just as productive with his hands as his feet. His evasive skills were excellent and he thrived on Bob Rose's intense training regimes, always presenting super fit.  A Copeland Trophy winner in 1969, Price represented the VFL the following year, and was widely acknowledged as one of the pre-eminent centremen in the game.  In 1976 he crossed to Claremont where he provided fine service in 49 games over the next three seasons.  Returning to Collingwood in 1979, Price added only 1 senior game, bringing his final total with the Magpies to 158 before retiring.

Price is now the Director of Sport at Scotch College Melbourne.

References

Collingwood Football Club players
Ararat Football Club players
Copeland Trophy winners
Australian rules footballers from Victoria (Australia)
1949 births
Living people